Hypertensive leukoencephalopathy refers to a degeneration of the white matter of the brain following a sudden increase in blood pressure.

Signs and symptoms
Symptoms include sudden increase in blood pressure, acute confusional state, headaches, vomiting, and seizure. Retinal hemorrhages and hard exudates may be present on funduscopic exam. Hypertensive leukoencephalopathy may have concurrent cardiac ischemia and hematuria.

Diagnosis
MRI shows hyperintensities on T2 weighted imaging, localized usually to the parietal and occipital regions.

Treatment
Antihypertensives may be an effective treatment.

See also

Leukoencephalopathy
Leukodystrophy

References

External links 

Brain disorders

de:Leukodystrophie
es:Leucodistrofia
fr:Leucodystrophie
nl:Leukodystrofie
pl:Leukodystrofie